Manuel Jesús Arana Rodríguez (born 3 December 1984) is a Spanish former footballer who played as a right winger.

He played 75 La Liga matches over four seasons, totalling seven goals for Racing de Santander and Rayo Vallecano. He added 164 appearances and 33 goals in the Segunda División, and also competed professionally in Australia, India and Gibraltar.

Club career
Arana was born in Seville, Andalusia. After not being able to reach the first team at Real Betis in his hometown he signed with CD Castellón, where he would first appear professionally in 2006–07's Segunda División, playing one game; in the following two seasons, also at that level, he proceeded to be used regularly.

In June 2009, Arana moved to La Liga with Racing de Santander, on a four-year contract. He made his debut in the competition on 30 August in a 1–4 home loss against Getafe CF, and scored in his third match for a 2–1 win at Málaga CF, going on to net three more goals in the league (totalling 1,749 minutes) as the side from Cantabria managed to retain their league status.

Arana terminated his contract with Racing in late August 2012, following the club's top-flight relegation. Four days later, he signed a two-year deal with Rayo Vallecano of the same league.

On 7 July 2014, Arana left Recreativo de Huelva and joined RCD Mallorca also in division two, for two years. On 30 September 2016 the 31-year-old moved abroad for the first time in his career, after being confirmed as the third visa player signing by Brisbane Roar FC for the 2016–17 season.

On 12 July 2017, Arana switched clubs and countries again, signing for FC Goa. He scored his debut goal for them on 25 November, but in a 2–1 away defeat to Mumbai City FC. On 31 January 2018, he was loaned to fellow Indian Super League team Delhi Dynamos FC until March.

Club statistics

References

External links

1984 births
Living people
Spanish footballers
Footballers from Seville
Association football wingers
La Liga players
Segunda División players
Segunda División B players
Tercera División players
Betis Deportivo Balompié footballers
CD Castellón footballers
Racing de Santander players
Rayo Vallecano players
Recreativo de Huelva players
RCD Mallorca players
CD Utrera players
A-League Men players
Brisbane Roar FC players
Indian Super League players
FC Goa players
Odisha FC players
Gibraltar Premier Division players
Europa F.C. players
Spanish expatriate footballers
Expatriate soccer players in Australia
Expatriate footballers in India
Expatriate footballers in Gibraltar
Spanish expatriate sportspeople in Australia
Spanish expatriate sportspeople in India
Spanish expatriate sportspeople in Gibraltar